William Jasper Brooks (October 13, 1922 – November 8, 2010) was an American baseball and basketball coach who is best known for developing the University of North Carolina at Wilmington athletics program from a junior college to a Division I school.  Brooks graduated with a Bachelor of Arts from Atlantic Christian College in 1948.  In 1951, he was hired by Wilmington College (now UNCW) as their athletic director, basketball coach, baseball coach, and chairman of the health and physical education department.  He directed the baseball team to a pair of national junior college baseball championships in 1961 and 1963 and also took the basketball team to the national tournament.

In 1975, he was named NAIA National Coach of the Year and was inducted into the National Junior College Baseball Coaches Hall of Fame in 1990.  Brooks became the first individual associated with UNC Wilmington to be inducted into the North Carolina Sports Hall of Fame in 1991.

References

1922 births
2010 deaths
Basketball coaches from North Carolina
People from Wilson, North Carolina
UNC Wilmington Seahawks athletic directors
UNC Wilmington Seahawks baseball coaches
UNC Wilmington Seahawks men's basketball coaches
Wake Forest Demon Deacons football players
Baseball coaches from North Carolina